Rushford is a city in Fillmore County, Minnesota, United States. The population was 1,860 at the 2020 census.

History
The first pioneers pole-boated up the Root River to the junction of Rush Creek, peering through 10-foot tall grasses to see what astonishing beauty the bluff lands had to offer. The early settlers gave Rushford its name on Christmas Day in 1854, during a chicken supper hosted by Capt. Dyer. The name stems from the nearby Rush Creek, which had tall Rushes growing along its banks.  The area was once referred to as “Trail City” because seven Indian trails met at the creek. The Wieser Brothers were said to be the first founders of the city and quickly followed by hundreds.

Rushford has had a post office in operation since 1856, and the  1867 two-story Railroad Depot still stands at its original site, being restored as a Visitors Center for the local area.

As a result of the 2007 Midwest flooding, the city was flooded when Rush Creek overtopped the dikes. Rushford's spirit bounced back to produce a very bustling and thriving community..

Geography
 
The city of Rushford is completely surrounded by another city, Rushford Village.

Rushford is located in southeastern Minnesota's Bluff Country, part of the driftless area.  Magelssen's Bluff, a 440-foot hill directly over the town, has the town name written in large white letters on the side of the hill.

Minnesota Highways 16, 30, and 43 are three of the main routes in the city.

Climate

Recreation

Every five years, Rushford holds a citywide Homecoming celebration, with a standing invitation to all former residents of the city to return and visit. The town also hosts an annual celebration formerly called "Frontier Days," now called "Rushford Days."

Rushford is one of several towns intersected by the Root River segment of the Blufflands State Trail, a Rails to Trails project linking several small towns along 42 miles of the former railroad grade. The historic Rushford Depot (pictured to the right) is a landmark along this trail, with a museum inside the old depot and other historic buildings on the grounds.

Rushford also has several parks and a public swimming pool.

Demographics

2010 census
As of the census of 2010, there were 1,731 people, 706 households, and 456 families living in the city. The racial makeup of the city was 98.7% White, 0.1% Native American, 0.3% Asian, 0.2% from other races, and 0.7% from two or more races. Hispanic or Latino of any race were 0.8% of the population.

There were 706 households, of which 31.7% had children under the age of 18 living with them, 50.8% were married couples living together, 10.9% had a female householder with no husband present, 2.8% had a male householder with no wife present, and 35.4% were non-families. 30.9% of all households were made up of individuals, and 17.3% had someone living alone who was 65 years of age or older. The average household size was 2.35 and the average family size was 2.93.

The median age in the city was 41.9 years. 24.1% of residents were under the age of 18; 6.7% were between the ages of 18 and 24; 22.5% were from 25 to 44; 25.8% were from 45 to 64, and 21% were 65 years of age or older. The gender makeup of the city was 47.3% male and 52.7% female.

2000 census
As of the census of 2000, there were 1,696 people, 704 households, and 433 families living in the city. The racial makeup of the city was 99.00% White, 0.24% African American, 0.12% Native American, 0.24% Asian, 0.29% from other races, and 0.12% from two or more races. 0.29% of the population were Hispanic or Latino of any race.

There were 704 households, out of which 29.3% had children under the age of 18 living with them, 52.1% were married couples living together, 8.1% had a female householder with no husband present, and 38.4% were non-families. 34.8% of all households were made up of individuals, and 22.2% had someone living alone who was 65 years of age or older. The average household size was 2.26 and the average family size was 2.93.

Education
Rushford is associated with nearby Peterson, Minnesota in Rushford-Peterson School District. Superintendent is Jon Thompson.

Rushford-Peterson School District held an open house on Saturday, Aug. 19, 2017 for the new 170,000-square-foot school building.

See also
Rushford Public Library

References

External links
City of Rushford
Rushford-Peterson School District
Rushford Peterson Valley
Rushford Days
Tri-County Record - Bluff Country News
Rushford Institute for NanoTechnology

Cities in Fillmore County, Minnesota
Cities in Minnesota